Jake Teshka is an American politician serving as a member of the Indiana House of Representatives from the 7th district. He assumed office on November 4, 2020.

Early life and education 
Teshka was born and raised in South Bend, Indiana. After graduating from St. Joseph High School, he earned a Bachelor of Arts degree in political science from Saint Joseph's College and a Master of Public Administration from Indiana University South Bend.

Career 
In 2008, Teshka worked as a regional political director for the Indiana Republican Party. He then worked as a field representative and executive director of the Saint Joseph County Republican Party. He served as a member of the South Bend Common Council from 2018 to 2020. During his tenure on the council, Teshka was the only Republican member. He was elected to the Indiana House of Representatives in November 2020. He also works as a business development officer at Interra Credit Union.

References

External links

Living people
Politicians from South Bend, Indiana
Saint Joseph's College (Indiana) alumni
Indiana University South Bend alumni
Republican Party members of the Indiana House of Representatives
21st-century American politicians
Year of birth missing (living people)